Caledonian Thistle F.C. competed in the Scottish Third Division in season 1995–96 and the Scottish League Cup, the Scottish Challenge Cup and Scottish Cup.

Results

Friendlies

Scottish Third Division

Final League table

Scottish League Cup

Scottish Challenge Cup

Scottish Cup

Hat-tricks

References

Inverness Caledonian Thistle F.C. seasons
Caledonian Thistle